The following lists events from the year 2011 in Jordan.

Incumbents 
 Monarch - Abdullah II

Events

January 
 January 1 - Ro'ya TV is launched.
 January 14 - Protests began, demanding the resignation of Prime Minister Samir Rifai and complaints about soaring food prices, which would continue into 2012.
 January 21 - Thousands of Jordanians protest in the streets against prices rising and demanding the resignation of several ministers.

February 
 February 1 - In response to the protests, King Abdullah II of Jordan sacks the cabinet of Rifai.

April 
 April 1 - Police attempt to separate pro and anti-government demonstrators in Amman.

October 
 October 24 - Awn Shawkat Al-Khasawneh's cabinet takes office.

References 

 
2010s in Jordan
Jordan
Years of the 21st century in Jordan
Jordan